Charles Knapp (22 June 1868 – 17 September 1936) was a United States classical scholar.

Biography
He was born in New York City. He graduated from Columbia University at age 19 and received a Doctorate of Philosophy (Ph.D.) in 1890 at 22 years of age, having been prize fellow 1887-1890. He became tutorial fellow in Latin (1890–91) and was appointed instructor in Latin and Greek (1891-1902), and adjunct professor of classical philology (1902–06). In 1906, he became a noted professor of classical philology at Barnard College, a women's liberal arts college affiliated with Columbia University.

An intellectual at heart, Knapp was nonetheless well liked by his students, as referenced in Barnard College: The First Fifty Years, a book presenting the history of the women's college and published by Columbia University.

Dr. Knapp used to say to his freshmen that he and they were alike travelers on the road of learning, and the space between was so small, in comparison with the length of the road, that it need be no hindrance to pleasant companionship thereon. Throughout his long teaching life this was his characteristic attitude, and his students recognized that his passion for intellectual honesty and hard work were equaled by his kindness and enthusiasm.

Writings
 Stories from Aulus Gellius (1895)
 Selections from Viri Romae (1896), in collaboration with R. Arrowsmith
 The Æneid of Virgil (1901, books I-VI, selections VII-XII) The dedication for this book reads: "To my sister, Miss Adeline Knapp, A.B., I am under especial obligations for valuable help in all parts of the book."

Knapp contributed to the American Journal of Philology, the Classical Journal, Classical Philology,  the Classical Review, and the Classical Weekly (of which he became managing editor in 1906). He also contributed articles on classical subjects to encyclopedic works.

Family
Knapp was married to Theresa Shaw in 1889 in Manhattan, New York. Together, they had one son, Charles M. Knapp, born 21 September 1892.

References

External links
 
 
 

American non-fiction writers
American philologists
1868 births
1936 deaths
Barnard College faculty
Classical scholars of Columbia University
Columbia College (New York) alumni